Roman Leonidovich Tkachuk (born 9 January 1987) is a Russian professional football player.

Club career
He made his Russian Football National League debut for FC Metallurg-Kuzbass Novokuznetsk on 10 July 2012 in a game against FC Neftekhimik Nizhnekamsk.

External links
 
 

1987 births
Sportspeople from Novosibirsk
Living people
Russian footballers
Association football defenders
FC Volgar Astrakhan players
Russian expatriate footballers
Expatriate footballers in Kazakhstan
FC Sibir Novosibirsk players
FC Baikal Irkutsk players
FC Novokuznetsk players
Russian people of Ukrainian descent
FC Chita players
FC Volga Ulyanovsk players